Laurence Gillooly CM (May 12, 1819 – January 12, 1895) was an Irish Roman Catholic bishop who served as the Bishop of Elphin from 1858 to 1895. 
The son of Laurence Gillooly and his wife Margaret (née McGann), he was born at Bothair Garbh, Gallowstown, County Roscommon, near Roscommon Town. His older brother, Timothy, also became a priest.

Brought up an Irish Catholic, he was educated locally in Roscommon, and at St Nathy's College in Ballaghadereen. He studied at the Irish College in Paris before ordination as a Vincentian Priest in 1847.
Favoured by Cardinal Cullen, his status as a ultramontanist helped him to obtain the position of bishopric of Elphin.

During Dr Gillhooly's time in Elphin, he developed many churches, including the re-development of Sligo Cathedral. He founded Summerhill College (originally outside Athlone, now in Sligo) as a Diocesan College. Gillhooly Hall is named after him.

References

1819 births
1895 deaths
Roman Catholic bishops of Elphin
Irish Vincentians
People from County Roscommon